Pamela Uba is an Irish scientist and model.  She grew up in Ballyhaunis, County Mayo. As Miss Ireland 2021, she was selected to represent Ireland in the Miss World 2022 beauty pageant. Uba is the first black woman to win the Miss Ireland competition and represent Ireland for the Miss World competition.

Background
Pamela Uba was born in 1995 in South Africa to Nigerian parents. She moved from Johannesburg to Ireland with her family as an asylum seeker when she was 8 years old. Uba spent 10 years in direct provision. She has since raised money for educational support for children in direct provision. Uba played Gaelic football as a centre back. She is a Gaelic Athletic Association fan, supporting her home county of Mayo. Singing is one of her passions and Uba has sung in numerous competitions including teen idol Dublin while recently recording two cover songs as part of her talent pieces for Miss World.

Career
Uba earned her undergraduate degree in medical science at Galway-Mayo Institute of Technology, before graduating with a Master's degree in clinical chemistry from Trinity College Dublin. She works as a medical scientist at University Hospital Galway.

Modelling and pageant title
In 2019, Uba won the Ladies Day prize at the Galway Races. In 2021, Uba won the Miss Ireland title. The 26 year old Miss Galway claimed the national title ahead of 29 other contestants at the Miss Ireland final, which took place in Cavan. She was crowned by three former titleholders. Uba is the first black woman to represent Ireland for the Miss World competition. After winning the Miss Ireland title Uba was "trollled and bullied online", but was also "overwhelmed with the support" of most people. Having herself grown up in direct provision, in October 2021 she became an ambassador for Dídean, "a social enterprise which provides alternative housing for residents in Direct Provision".

She works as a part-time model (as well as working as a medical scientist at University Hospital Galway). Pamela is one of the top 40 finalists set to represent her country Ireland at the 70th Miss world competition after performing really well in various challenge events. She came 3rd in sports and was in the talent top 27 for singing a rendition of George Micheal’s song Praying for time, and also dominating her performance in the head to head challenge. Miss World final is set for March 16th 2022 in Puerto Rico after being postponed due to covid.

References

Living people
People from County Galway
People from County Mayo
Beauty pageant contestants from Ireland
Miss World 2021 delegates
Alumni of Trinity College Dublin
Miss Ireland winners
Irish female models
Alumni of Galway-Mayo Institute of Technology
1996 births
Irish people of Nigerian descent
21st-century Irish women scientists